This is the discography of English singer Elkie Brooks.

Studio albums

Live albums

Compilations

Singles

Other appearances

Singles
Cat Stevens duet with Elkie Brooks Remember the Days of the Old Schoolyard, (Linda Lewis appears in the song's video).

Various Artists The Anti-Heroin Project. Charity Single produced by Charles Foskett.

Guest appearances:John Parr, Elkie Brooks, Bonnie Tyler, Nik Kershaw, Holly Johnson, Kim Wilde, Hazel O'Connor, Cliff Richard, Robin Gibb and others.

Albums
Vinegar Joe with Elkie Brooks, Robert Palmer and Pete Gage.

Various Artists Original Studio Cast: Frankie Miller, Alice Cooper, Elkie Brooks, The Who's John Entwistle, Jim "Dandy" Mangrum, James Dewar, Keith Moon, Justin Hayward, Eddie Jobson.

Lou Reizner's stage production of Tommy featuring the London Symphony Orchestra.

This version featured Roger Daltrey, David Essex, Marsha Hunt, Elkie Brooks, Roger Chapman, Graham Bell, Bill Oddie, Merry Clayton, Vivian Stanshall, Roy Wood and John Pertwee.

References 

Discographies of British artists
Blues discographies
Jazz discographies
Pop music discographies
Rock music discographies